Kim Ji-young: Born 1982 is a 2019 South Korean drama film starring Jung Yu-mi and Gong Yoo. Based on the million-seller novel of the same name by Cho Nam-Joo, it was released on October 23, 2019.

Plot
Kim Ji-young, a woman in her 30s, starts acting strangely, seemingly possessed by her mother and late grandmother.

Cast

Main
 Jung Yu-mi as Kim Ji-young
 Kim Ha-yeon as 12 year old Ji-yeong
 Gong Yoo as Jung Dae-hyun

Supporting
 Kim Mi-kyung as Mi-sook
 Gong Min-jeung as Kim Eun-young
 Park Sung-yeon as Kim Eun-sil
 Lee Bong-ryun as Hye-soo
 Kim Gook-hee as Soo-bin's mother	
 Kim Sung-cheol as Kim Ji-seok
 Lee Eol as Young-soo
 Cha Mi-kyung as Dae-hyun's mother
 Son Sung-chan as Dae-hyun's father
 Woo Ji-hyun as Byung-shik	
 Kang Ae-shim as Ji-young's grandmother
 Yoon Sa-bong as Soo-hyun

Special appearances
 Ye Soo-jung as Ji-young's grandmother
 Yeom Hye-ran as Woman with scarf in the past

Production

Development
The film marks actress-turned-director Kim Do-young's debut feature film. While adapting the novel into a film, Kim's "biggest task was to weave the series of independent episodes in the original material into a story with a central narrative."

Casting
On September 12, 2018, Jung Yu-mi was confirmed to play the titular role of the film. On October 17, Gong Yoo was confirmed to play Kim Ji-young's husband, starring for the third time alongside Jung Yu-mi after Silenced (2011) and Train to Busan (2016). After these announcements, the cast received hateful comments from anti-feminists (comments which had already been made when the novel became popular in South Korea), but both actors "said that they didn’t mind the haters as much as many had feared [and] instead, their desire to do the story justice was their main focus."

Filming
Principal photography began on January 21, 2019 in Gwangmyeong. Filming was completed in April.

Release
On September 21, 2019, a character poster featuring Jung Yu-mi was released with the announcement of an October release. On September 26, the official trailer was released. On October 12, it was confirmed that the film would premiere on the 23rd.

The film will be screened at the 2nd Pyeongchang International Peace Film Festival, whose year's theme is "woman," in June 2020 in the Spectrum K section.

Impact
According to a study made by the National Library of Korea, Cho Nam-joo's Kim Ji-young, Born 1982 was the most borrowed novel in South Korea in 2019 for the second consecutive year. The book was mostly borrowed by women in their 40s and the number of loans increased by 43% in October when the film was released.

Reception

Box office
In South Korea, the film topped the box office for the week of October 27, 2019. It surpassed 1 million moviegoers in five days, 2 million in eleven days and 3 million in eighteen days. As of November 2020, the film has reached 3,679,099 total admissions grossing $27,168,574 in revenue.

Critical response
According to Pierce Conran of the Korean Film Council, "reviews for the film have been strong while the largely female audience (roughly 68%, according to Naver portal viewer ratings) have also been extremely positive."

Accolades

References

External links
 
 
 

2019 films
2010s Korean-language films
2010s feminist films
Films about sexism
South Korean drama films
Films based on South Korean novels
Lotte Entertainment films
2019 directorial debut films
2019 drama films
2010s South Korean films